Warrimoo (formerly Karabah) is a medium-sized village in the lower Blue Mountains of New South Wales, Australia, 273 metres above sea level.  The state government's electorate is Blue Mountains and the state member is Labor's Trisha Lee Doyle.

Federally, the electorate is Macquarie and the federal member is Labor's Susan Templeman. Warrimoo is located 68 kilometres west of Sydney, in the local government area of the City of Blue Mountains. Local council Mayor is Labor's Mark Greenhill.
Warrimoo borders the townships/suburbs of Blaxland, Mount Riverview, Sun Valley and Valley Heights. The suburb is 5 train stops from Penrith and 11 train stops to Katoomba.

Population
The population of Warrimoo is mostly European background. Languages apart from English spoken in Warrimoo include French, Mandarin, Greek, Spanish and Italian. 31% of residents hold bachelor's degrees or higher and 30% are professionals. More than 35% claim to have no religious affiliation. The median weekly household income is $2,097.

Local Services

At the centre of Warrimoo is railway station (with bike racks) and Warrimoo Citizens Hall. There are several shops around the train station including a post office, fire station, cafe, car mechanic, antique shops, Italian restaurant/venue hire and an old fashioned general store which is a popular tourist bus stop off point for groups heading to Katoomba and the Jenolan Caves.

Other local businesses include:
 Blue Mountains Driving School
 Blue Sky music recording studio
 Sky Valley Studio
 Dance Empire dance studio
 The Craft Company
 Warrimoo Kitchens

The closest shopping mall is Westfield Penrith.

Parks/Entertainment
Parks include Ardill Park, Arthur St Park, Possum Park, Terrymont Rd Park and Cross St Nature Reserve. The Florabella Pass track is a popular hike between Warrimoo and Blaxland. Tennis Courts and Warrimoo oval are both on Rickard Rd.

Other local attractions within a 10 km radius include Glenbrook Swim Centre, Nepean River, Nepean Belle Paddlewheeler, Sydney International Regatta Centre, iFLY Downunder, Jetpack Adventures, Cables Wake Park, Glenbrook Cinema and Penrith Panthers. A further 20 minutes from Penrith is water park, Wet'n'Wild and Sydney Zoo.

Hospitals
Warrimoo is close to both the major teaching hospital, Nepean Hospital (14 km) and Springwood hospital (6 km). Buckland Aged Care Services and Nursing Home are 6 km away.

Transport
Warrimoo railway station is on the Blue Mountains Line of the NSW TrainLink intercity network. Warrimoo is also serviced by bus through Blue Mountains Transit and uber. The original 1918 Warrimoo station burnt down in a bushfire in the 1950s and was subsequently rebuilt. A decision by the NSW Liberal government to buy new South Korean made trains has resulted in controversy over Warrimoo's train station which may need renovating to accommodate the trains that are up to 205 metres long. Added to that, the train tracks may also need adjusting. Western Sydney Airport is due to open in 2026 with a train link via Parramatta.

Schools/childcare
Warrimoo is served by a private childcare facility (Bush babies), small public school on Florabella Rd (Warrimoo Public School) and a K-12 private school (Wycliffe Christian School).

Other nearby schools include Blue Mountains Grammar School, Springwood High, Winmalee High and Blaxland High.

Culture

Author and illustrator Dorothy Wall, who lived in Florabella St (1934–37), placed Warrimoo on the map with her children's books about the mischievous koala, Blinky Bill. Polish born film maker Yoram Gross, turned the books into movies bringing the iconic character onto the world stage. Blinky Bill is not the only koala bear story written by a Blue Mountains resident.

Not far away is the Norman Lindsay Gallery and Museum in Faulconbridge. Norman Lindsay wrote about Bunyip Bluegum, the anthropomorphic koala star of well known children's book, The Magic Pudding which was also turned into a movie, directed by Karl Zwicky.

Former Daily Telegraph journalist and founding 'House and Garden' editor Beryl Guertner, lived in Warrimoo.

There are local music and choir groups that are community run such as the Moo Choir, which meets and performs out of the Warrimoo Public School hall, and the biannual music group, the Sound Lounge.

George Finey, who was a cartoonist on the Daily Telegraph also spent time living in Warrimoo.

University and TAFE
Western Sydney University has a campus in Penrith, 5 train stops away. Blue Mountains TAFE colleges are in Wentworth Falls, Katoomba, Nepean and Penrith.

Bushwalking
The Florabella Pass Track is a popular and scenic nature walk from Warrimoo into Blaxland and passes through abundant foliage, creeks and rare wildlife. The bush walk leads into a thick rainforest filled with Lyrebirds, Flame Robins, Sulphur-Crested Cockatoos, Gang Gang Cockatoos, Owls and other rare species. The Pippas Pass portion of the track is renowned for its colourful bushland such as flannel flowers, Waratah plants and pink angophoras and its shelter caves. The walk is less than 9 km however involves some steep hiking. There are many other bushwalking tracks. The Wilderness Society and other environmental groups encourage koala sightings to be reported due to their endangered existence.

History
Warrimoo is an Aboriginal word meaning eagle's nest or  place of the screaming white bird.

In 1898, a railway station platform named Karabah (meaning 'large garden' in Azerbaijani) was built in the area to service a developing estate, possibly sharing the same name. It had closed before World War I, but in 1918 a new station was built, not much further down the Blue Mountains line, named Warrimoo. Entrepreneur and developer, Arthur Rickard was behind the development of Warrimoo. His plan was to subdivide blocks so there were a mixture of small blocks and larger blocks which he established to promote sustainable living. On what was known as the Warrimoo Estate, Rickard encouraged residents to develop orchards, vegetable gardens and raise chickens. Warrimoo retains many historical homes and buildings throughout the village including a distillery (where the local public school now sits) and a former 'Bordillo'. Charity worker and gospeller George Ardill, moved to Warrimoo in his latter years. He lived at 13 Florabella rd. During his years there, Ardill built numerous homes along Florabella st and The Avenue which he set up for homeless women and children.

Dorothy Wall, author of the children's book Blinky Bill, lived in Warrimoo from 1934 to 1937 whilst publishing the second book of the series. In 2015, a mural was painted at Possum Park in honour of the illustrator.

Heritage listings 
Warimoo has a number of heritage listings, including:
 Blue Mountains National Park: Blue Mountains walking tracks

References

External links

Towns in New South Wales
Suburbs of the City of Blue Mountains